In control theory, the cross Gramian (also referred to by ) is a Gramian matrix used to determine how controllable and observable a linear system is.

For the stable time-invariant linear system 

the cross Gramian is defined as:

and thus also given by the solution to  the Sylvester equation:

This means the cross Gramian is not strictly a Gramian matrix, since it is generally neither positive semi-definite nor symmetric.

The triple  is controllable and observable, and hence minimal, if and only if the matrix  is nonsingular, (i.e.  has full rank, for any ).

If the associated system  is furthermore symmetric, such that there exists a transformation  with

then the absolute value of the eigenvalues of the cross Gramian equal Hankel singular values:

Thus the direct truncation of the Eigendecomposition of the cross Gramian allows model order reduction (see ) without a balancing procedure as opposed to balanced truncation.

The cross Gramian has also applications in decentralized control, sensitivity analysis, and the inverse scattering transform.

See also 

 Controllability Gramian
 Observability Gramian

References 

Control theory
Systems theory
Matrices
Determinants
Analytic geometry